There are several figures in Greek mythology named Manto  (Ancient Greek: Μαντώ), the most prominent being the daughter of Tiresias. The name Manto derives from Ancient Greek Mantis, "seer, prophet".

 Manto, daughter of Tiresias.
 Manto, daughter of Heracles. According to Servius (comm. on Virgil, Aeneid X, 199), some held that this was the Manto for whom Mantua was named.
 Manto, daughter of the seer Polyidus. She and her sister Astycrateia were brought to Megara by their father, who came there to cleanse Alcathous for the murder of his son Callipolis. The tomb of the two sisters was shown at Megara in later times.
 Manto, daughter of another famous seer, Melampus. Her mother was Iphianeira, daughter of Megapenthes, and her siblings were Antiphates, Bias and Pronoe.
 Manto is remembered in De Mulieribus Claris, a collection of biographies of historical and mythological women by the Florentine author Giovanni Boccaccio, composed in 136162. It is notable as the first collection devoted exclusively to biographies of women in Western literature.

See also 
870 Manto

Notes

References
Diodorus Siculus, The Library of History translated by Charles Henry Oldfather. Twelve volumes. Loeb Classical Library. Cambridge, Massachusetts: Harvard University Press; London: William Heinemann, Ltd. 1989. Vol. 3. Books 4.59–8. Online version at Bill Thayer's Web Site
Diodorus Siculus, Bibliotheca Historica. Vol 1-2. Immanel Bekker. Ludwig Dindorf. Friedrich Vogel. in aedibus B. G. Teubneri. Leipzig. 1888–1890. Greek text available at the Perseus Digital Library.
Isidore. Etymologiae xv.1.59.
Pausanias, Description of Greece with an English Translation by W.H.S. Jones, Litt.D., and H.A. Ormerod, M.A., in 4 Volumes. Cambridge, MA, Harvard University Press; London, William Heinemann Ltd. 1918. . Online version at the Perseus Digital Library
Pausanias, Graeciae Descriptio. 3 vols. Leipzig, Teubner. 1903.  Greek text available at the Perseus Digital Library.
Pomponius Mela. De chorographia i.88.
Publius Papinius Statius, The Thebaid translated by John Henry Mozley. Loeb Classical Library Volumes. Cambridge, MA, Harvard University Press; London, William Heinemann Ltd. 1928. Online version at the Topos Text Project.
Publius Papinius Statius, The Thebaid. Vol I-II. John Henry Mozley. London: William Heinemann; New York: G.P. Putnam's Sons. 1928. Latin text available at the Perseus Digital Library.
Statius. Thebais iv.463–468, x.597–603.
Publius Vergilius Maro, Eclogues. J. B. Greenough. Boston. Ginn & Co. 1895. Online version at the Perseus Digital Library.
Publius Vergilius Maro, Bucolics, Aeneid, and Georgics of Vergil. J. B. Greenough. Boston. Ginn & Co. 1900. Latin text available at the Perseus Digital Library.
Virgil. Eclogae ix.59–60.

Children of Heracles
Heracleidae
Women of Apollo
Mythological Greek seers
Women in Greek mythology
Mythology of Argos